White Oak Township may refer to the following places:

Arkansas
 White Oak Township, Cleveland County, Arkansas
 White Oak Township, Franklin County, Arkansas
 White Oak Township, Sebastian County, Arkansas

Illinois
 White Oak Township, McLean County, Illinois

Iowa
 White Oak Township, Mahaska County, Iowa
 White Oak Township, Warren County, Iowa

Michigan
 White Oak Township, Ingham County, Michigan

Minnesota
 White Oak Township, Hubbard County, Minnesota

Missouri
 White Oak Township, Henry County, Missouri
 White Oak Township, Harrison County, Missouri

North Carolina
 White Oak Township, Bladen County, North Carolina
 White Oak Township, Carteret County, North Carolina
 White Oak Township, Haywood County, North Carolina
 White Oak Township, Onslow County, North Carolina
 White Oak Township, Polk County, North Carolina
 White Oak Township, Wake County, North Carolina

Ohio
 White Oak Township, Highland County, Ohio

See also
 White Township (disambiguation)
 White River Township (disambiguation)
 White Rock Township (disambiguation)
 White Oak (disambiguation)

Township name disambiguation pages